Premna parasitica is a species of flowering plant in the family Lamiaceae, native to Java and Bali, Indonesia. Its fruit is readily consumed by the Sunda Island leaf monkey, Presbytis comata.

References

parasitica
Endemic flora of Indonesia
Flora of Java
Flora of Bali
Plants described in 1823
Taxa named by Carl Ludwig Blume